Perrinia angulifera is a species of sea snail, a marine gastropod mollusk in the family Chilodontidae.

Description
The size of the shell varies between 5 mm and 26 mm. The imperforate shell has an elevated-conoidal shape. The nearly plane whorls are imbricated and angulated below. They are longitudinally nodose-costate, and ornamented with transverse girdles of subdistant tubercles. The interstices are channelled. The body whorl is subangulate. The columella is straight and short. It terminates in a small tooth. The outer lip is subduplicate and sulcate inside.

Distribution
This marine species occurs in the Philippines and the Gulf of Oman.

References

External links
 To Encyclopedia of Life
 To World Register of Marine Species
 

angulifera
Gastropods described in 1853